Dr. Jessamy Tiffen is an Australian Scientist and senior researcher in the Melanoma Immunology and Oncology Program at the Centenary Institute of Cancer Medicine and Cell Biology at the University of Sydney, New South Wales, Australia.

Early life 
Tiffen's grandfather was a microbiologist and her interest in science stems from conversations with her grandfather growing up.

Career 
Tiffen's work focuses on melanoma, and why some melanomas respond to treatment in certain individuals but others do not.

Tiffen co-authored a study in 2016 which identified a drug that could be effective in fighting melanoma, and is currently researching a new treatment strategy with Dr. Hsin-Yi Tseng that involves inducing melanoma cellular self-destruction.

References

Living people
Year of birth missing (living people)
Cancer researchers
Australian women scientists
Australian biologists